Waléra Kanischtscheff (or Putiloff; Russian: Валера Канищев) is a Russian-Ukrainian actor currently based in Kreuzberg (Tempelhofer Berge), Berlin, Germany. He is a prolific voice-actor of German voice overs for English films.

Filmography

Actor in film
 - Three joyful shifts, Valery Pozdnyakov 
 - Ryadom s komissarom (1978) (TV) Alexander Tchekmenew
 - Kapitan Sovri-golova, Nikolai Lukyanov 
 - Bratya Riko, The Brothers Rico, Gennadiy Ivanov, sov.version for The Brothers Rico
 - Dubrowski Alexander Pushkin (novel) Vyacheslav Nikiforov 
 - Udivitelnye priklyucheniya Denisa Korablyova Igor Dobrolyubov
 1994 - Buenas Tardes Amigo, Hendrik Handloegten
 1995 - A French Woman, directed by Régis Wargnier
 1998 - The Caucasian Night, Die Kaukasische Nacht, Gordian Maugg 
 2001 - Swetlana, Tamara Staudt, WDR Fernsehen 
 2001 - Einspruch II, Rolando Colla, Elena Pedrazzoli 
 2002 - The Cosmonaut's Letter (Der Brief des Kosmonauten), Vladimir Torbica 
 2004 - Leipzig Homicide: Der Auftragsmord, Christoph Eichhorn  
 2004 - DVD bonus: Der Spiegel, "Alles ist unsterblich" by A.Tarkowski 
 2004 - Das Bernsteinamulett, directed by Gabi Kubach, prod. Regina Ziegler
 2004 - Der letzte Zeuge: Sandkastenliebe
 2004 - Autobahn, Bartosz Werner, Konrad Wolf Film University of Babelsberg
 2004 - Européens Teneriffa, Saara Saarela 
 2005 - Doppelter Einsatz: Spurlos verschwunden
 2005 - Küstenwache: Dunkle Geschäfte
 2005 - Die schönsten Jahre, Gabi Kubach, prod. UFA Fernsehproduktion  
 2006 - Küstenwache: Gnadenlos gejagt
 2006 - Goldene Zeiten, directed by Peter Thorwarth 
 2006 - Verschleppt - Kein Weg zurück
 2006 - Die Abrechnung, directed by Thorsten Näter  
 2006 - Les Européens Tenerife 
 2006 - Beyond the Balance, directed by Bernd Heiber  
 2007 - Notruf Hafenkante: Das kalte Herz
 2008 - , directed by Joseph Vilsmaier  
 2010 - We Are the Night, directed by Dennis Gansel, prod. Constantin Film
 2010 - Snowman's Land, Tomasz Thomson  
 2011 - Dr. Ketel, Linus De Paoli 
 2011 -  (Polnische Ostern), directed by 
 2011 - , directed by 
 2012 - Invasion, Dito Tsintsadze  
 2012 - The Berlin Project (90 Minuten – Das Berlin Projekt), Ivo Trajkov  
 2012 - Men Do What They Can, directed by Marc Rothemund  
 2013 - Bored to Death v.o. Russendisco "The case of the lonely white dove"
 2013 - , directed by Uli Edel, prod. Oliver Berben
 2015 - Großstadtrevier: Das Licht, directed by Lars Jessen 
 2016 - Fucking Berlin, directed by Florian Gottschick   
 2016 - მეგობარი (Der Freund), Dito Tsintsadze 
 2017 - Die Chefin, directed by Florian Kern; prod. Network Movie Film- und Fernsehproduktion GmbH; ZDF
 2017 - Der Kriminalist: Die Offene Tür, directed by Züli Aladağ; ZDF
 2018 - Babylon Berlin, Tom Tykwer, Achim von Borries, Henk Handloegten, Stefan Arndt, Sky 1, Das Erste
 2019 - Der Bulle und das Biest, prod. Sat.1
 2020 - Hey, Pa!project Leonid Rybakov 
 2020 - Unterleuten, Matti Geschonneck, prod. Network Movie, ZDF
 2022 - Pilot Project, Arte
 2022 - Lviv Guys docUA
 2023 - Roxy, Dito Tsintsadze, East End Film GmbH

German voice-overs (dubbing)
 2000 - Lock, Stock... v.o.
 2000 - Company Man, Peter Askin, Douglas McGrath v.o.
 2000 - The Man Who Cried, Sally Potter v.o.
 2001 - So weit die Füße tragen v.o.
 2002 - Bad Company, Joel Schumacher v.o.
 2002 - Ripley's Game, Liliana Cavani v.o.
 2002 - Life or Something Like It, Stephen Herek v.o.
 2002 - Crime and Punishment, Menahem Golan v.o.
 2003 - Red Rover, Marc S. Grenier v.o.
 2004 - The Day After Tomorrow, Roland Emmerich v.o.
 2004 - Terminal, Steven Spielberg v.o.
 2004 - Meet the Fockers, Jay Roach v.o.
 2005 - The Mechanik, Dolph Lundgren v.o.
 2005 - Gentille, Sophie Fillières v.o.
 2005 - Le petit lieutenant The Young Lieutenant, Xavier Beauvois v.o.
 2005 - Sorstalanság Fateless, Lajos Koltai v.o.
 2006 - The Good Sheperd, Robert De Niro v.o.
 2006 - "National Geographic World", Marvi Hämmer, rap song singer
 2006 - Casino Royale, Martin Campbell v.o.
 2006 - Deadwood v.o.
 2006 - L'étoile du soldat, Christophe de Ponfilly v.o.
 2006 - , Jo Baier v.o.
 2007 - We Own the Night, James Gray, Columbia Pictures v.o.
 2007 - Are We Done Yet?, Steve Carr v.o.
 2007 - American Dad! (season 4), Steve Hely v.o., animation
 2007 - Eastern Promises, David Cronenberg v.o.
 2007 - March of Millions, Kai Wessel v.o.
 2007 - The Visitor, Tom McCarthy v.o.
 2008 - Indiana Jones and the Kingdom of the Crystal Skull, Steven Spielberg v.o.
 2008 - Semi-Pro, Kent Alterman v.o.
 2008 - Get Smart, Peter Segal v.o.
 2008 - Bank Linkeroever, Left Bank, Pieter Van Hees v.o.
 2008 - Une femme à abattre Sie wusste zuviel, Olivier Langlois v.o.
 2008 - Absurdistan, Veit Helmer, by actors casting
 2008 - Transsiberian, Brad Anderson v.o.
 2008 - Righteous Kill, Jon Avnet v.o.
 2008 - , directed by Joseph Vilsmaier – Role:"Alexander Marinesko"
 2009 - Anonyma – Eine Frau in Berlin, Max Färberböck v.o.
 2009 - Ten Winters, Valerio Mieli v.o.
 2009 - Middle Men, George Gallo v.o.
 2009 - Night at the Museum: Battle of the Smithsonian, Shawn Levy, vo-russ. coach
 2009 - Street Fighter: The Legend of Chun-Li, Andrzej Bartkowiak v.o.
 2009 - 2012, Roland Emmerich v.o.
 2009 - So glücklich war ich noch nie, Alexander Adolph, Sprachführer Russian language
 2009 - Hilde, Kai Wessel v.o.
 2009 - The Imaginarium of Doctor Parnassus, Terry Gilliam v.o.
 2009 - The International, Tom Tykwer v.o.
 2009 - Audio-Guide (russian) in Deutscher Bundestag Reichstag – Role:"Russian Bundestag Reichstag Guide" 
 2010 - Schwerkraft, Maximilian Erlenwein, a c t o r
 2010 - Takers, John Luessenhop v.o.
 2010 - Wiegenlieder, Tamara Trampe, Johann Feindt, a c t o r
 2010 - The Way Back, Peter Weir v.o. & russ.coach
 2010 - Anna und die Liebe, Anna et l'amour Sat.1, a c t o r
 2010 - Chanel Coco & Igor Stravinsky Jan Kounen v.o. – Role:"Sergey Diagilev" 
 2010 - Sechs Tage Angst, Markus Fischer, a c t o r
 2010 - The Tourist, Florian Henckel von Donnersmarck v.o.
 2010 - Hangover 2, Todd Phillips v.o.
 2010 - Predators, Nimród Antal v.o.
 2011 - Big Mommas: Like Father, Like Son, John Whitesell v.o.
 2011 - 7 Khoon Maaf, Vishal Bhardwaj v.o.
 2011 - Limitless, Neil Burger v.o.
 2011 - Generation War, Unsere Mütter,unsere Väter, Philipp Kadelbach v.o.
 2011 - Transformers: Dark of the Moon, Michael Bay v.o.
 2011 - Johnny English Reborn, Oliver Parker v.o.
 2011 - Tinker Tailor Soldier Spy, Tomas Alfredson v.o.
 2011 - The Darkest Hour, Timur Nuruachitowitsch Bekmambetow v.o.
 2011 - Baikonur, Veit Helmer v.o.
 2012 - Titanic TV v.o.
 2012 - Spies of Warsaw v.o.
 2012 - Kurt Wallander, The Dogs of Riga v.o.
 2012 - The girl with the Dragon Tattoo, David Fincher v.o.
 2012 - The Avengers, Joss Whedon v.o.
 2012 - Chernobyl Diaries, Oren Peli v.o.
 2013 - Thriller Amokspiel, Sebastian Fitzek v.o.
 2014 - Willkommen bei Habib, Habib Rhapsody, Farbfilm Verleih GmbH
 2014 - Sibella, directed by Bernadette Kolonko, Konrad Wolf Film University of Babelsberg 
 2013 - Heute-show, Oliver Welke, Victor Hausten, ZDF 
 2013 - George, Götz George, Joachim A. Lang 
 2013 - , "Die Geschichte des Hauses Adlon", Uli Edel 
 2015 - Downton Abbey, ITV Studios, Julian Fellowes v.o. - Аббатство Даунтон – Role:"Count Nikolai Rostov"
 2015 - John Wick, David Leitch v.o.
 2015 - Genius loci - Fremde Träume, 3D-Film, Dokumentarfilm, Alexander Säidow 
 2015 - Mark Brandis, Universal Music Group, sprecher
 2015 - Danbé, la tête haute, EuropaCorp Télévision, Arte v.o.
 2015 - Kingsman: The Secret Service, Matthew Vaughn v.o.
 2015 - Gomorrah, Roberto Saviano, Francesca Comencini, Stefano Sollima, Claudio Cupellini v.o.
 2015 - Samba, directed by Olivier Nakache, Eric Toledano v.o.
 2015 - Vor dem Fest, Rundfunk Berlin-Brandenburg, a c t o r, sprecher
 2015 - Mortdecai, David Koepp, Johnny Depp v.o.
 2015 - Taken 3, directed by Olivier Megaton, Luc Besson v.o.
 2015 - Everest, directed by Baltasar Kormákur, Universal Pictures – Role:"Anatoli Boukreev"
 2015 - Bridge of Spies, directed by Steven Spielberg, Babelsberg Studio v.o.
 2015 - The Man from U.N.C.L.E., Codename U.N.C.L.E., directed by Guy Ritchie v.o.
 2015 - Eisenstein in Guanajuato, directed by Peter Greenaway – Role:"Grisha Alexandrov"
 2016 - Castle, ABC Studios v.o.
 2016 - House of Cards, Media Rights Capital v.o.
 2016 - Riot, directed by John Lyde v.o.
 2016 - Legends of Tomorrow, Warner Bros. Television v.o.
 2016 - Madam Secretary, CBS Television Studios v.o.
 2016 - The Purge: Election Year, directed by James DeMonaco, Universal Pictures v.o.
 2016 - Deadpool, Colossus (comics), Tim Miller (director), 20th Century Fox, Marvel Entertainment – Role:"Colossus"
 2016 - Sing, Garth Jennings, Universal Pictures v.o.
 2017 - Countdown, John Stockwell (actor), WWE Studios v.o.
 2017 - Blue Bloods (TV series), David Barrett (director) v.o.
 2017 - Riviera, TV miniseries, Philipp Kadelbach v.o.
 2017 - Designated Survivor (TV series), ABC Studios v.o.
 2017 - GLOW, Netflix v.o.
 2017 - Shooter (TV series), Paramount Television v.o.
 2017 - Shameless, Warner Bros. Television v.o.
 2017 - XXX: Return of Xander Cage, directed by D. J. Caruso, Vin Diesel, Columbia Pictures, Paramount Pictures v.o.
 2017 - Taken, Luc Besson, Universal Television v.o. & russ. coach
 2017 - Genius, National Geographic, Imagine Television, Fox 21 Television Studios v. o.
 2017 - Endeavour, Mammoth Screen, Masterpiece v. o.
 2017 - Legends of Tomorrow, Warner Bros. Television, DC Comics v.o.
 2017 - High Maintenance, HBO v.o.
 2017 - Agents of S.H.I.E.L.D., Marvel Television, ABC Studios, Mutant Enemy Productions v.o.
 2017 - Criminal Minds: Beyond Borders, CBS Television Studios v.o.
 2017 - Flikken Maastricht, Cops Maastricht, Victor Reinier, Eyeworks v.o.
 2017 - American Assassin, Michael Cuesta, CBS Films v.o.
 2017 - Small Town Killers, Ole Bornedal, Miso Film, Nordisk Film v.o.
 2017 - Peaky Blinders, Caryn Mandabach, Tiger Aspect Productions, BBC Two v.o. – Role:"Anton Kaledin"
 2018 - In the Courtyard, Pierre Salvadori, France 2 Cinéma v.o.
 2018 - Okkupert, Erik Skjoldbjærg, Yellow Bird v.o.
 2018 - The Americans, Joseph Weisberg, DreamWorks Television v.o.
 2018 - The X-Files, Chris Carter, 20th Century Fox Television v.o.
 2018 - Billions (TV series), Showtime Networks, CBS Television Studios v.o.
 2018 - Navy CIS, Terrence O'Hara, CBS Television Studios v.o.
 2018 - Barry (TV series), Alec Berg, Bill Hader, HBO v.o
 2018 - Hawaii Five-0 (2010 TV series), CBS Television Studios v.o.
 2018 - NCIS: Los Angeles, CBS Television Studios v.o.
 2018 - The Librarians (2014 TV series), Electric Entertainment v.o.
 2018 - GLOW (TV series), Netflix v.o.
 2018 - Take Two (TV series), ABC Studios v.o.
 2018 - Baskets (TV series), 3 Arts Entertainment v.o.
 2018 - Taken (2017 TV series), Luc Besson, EuropaCorp Television v.o.
 2018 - Agents of S.H.I.E.L.D., Marvel Television, ABC Studios, Mutant Enemy Productions v.o. 
 2018 - Final Score (2018 film), Scott Mann, Sky Cinema v.o.
 2018 - Killing Eve, Phoebe Waller-Bridge, BBC America v.o.
 2018 - Mute (2018 film), Duncan Jones, Netflix v.o.
 2018 - Elementary (TV series), CBS Television Studios v.o.
 2018 - Hunter Killer (film), Donovan Marsh, Original Film v.o.
 2018 - Champagner & Macarons - Ein unvergessliches Gartenfest (2018), Place publique, Agnés Jaoui, SBS Films
 2018 - Ant-Man and the Wasp, Peyton Reed, Marvel Comics v.o.
 2018 - Deadpool 2, David Leitch, Genre Films – Role:"Peter Rasputin Colossus"
 2018 - The Shape of Water (film), Guillermo del Toro, Fox Searchlight Pictures v.o.
 2019 - Can You Ever Forgive Me? (film), Marielle Heller, Anne Carey v.o.
 2019 - Orange Is the New Black, Lionsgate Television v.o.
 2019 - Whiskey Cavalier, Warner Bros. Television v.o.
 2019 - Hassel, Amir Chamdin, Nice Drama v.o.
 2019 - Killing Eve, BBC America vo
 2019 - Strike Back (TV series), Bill Eagles vo
 2019 - NCIS: New Orleans, CBS Television Studios vo
 2019 - Brooklyn Nine-Nine, Gintars, NBCUniversal Television Distribution vo
 2019 - The Twilight Zone (2019 TV series), CBS Television Network
 2019 - You (TV series), Warner Bros. Television Distribution v.o. 
 2019 - Charité, Anno Saul, UFA Fiction v.o.
 2019 - The Lion Guard, Die Garde der Löwen, Disney Television Animation 
 2019 - Iron Sky: The Coming Race, Timo Vuorensola, Iron Sky Universe – Role:"Josef Stalin"
 2020 - Batwoman (TV series) Warner Bros. Television
 2020 - Cornelsen Verlag GmbH Semion Baranovsky 
 2020 - Years and Years (TV series), HBO, BBC
 2020 - Section Zéro Olivier Marchal Luc Besson EuropaCorp Télévision Canal+
 2020 - Henry Danger Dan Schneider Dana Olsen Nickelodeon
 2021 - Queen of the South (TV series) 
 2021 - OSS 117: From Africa with Love Nicolas Bedos Mandarin Films M6 Films Gaumont
 2021 - Spitting Image Love Island X Andy De Emmony Avalon Television BritBox – Role: "Vladimir Putin"
 2022 - 名探偵コナン Case Closed Detective Conan
 2022 - Manayek Yoav Gross Productions
 2022 - Andropoz Netflix
 2022 - The Boys (TV series) Amazon Studios  Original Film  Sony Pictures Television
 2022 - Ukraine Украïна Ind.corp.
 2022 - Agent Hamilton (TV series) Petter S. Rosenlund Beta Films
 2022 - Chicago Med Dick Wolf Wolf Entertainment Universal Television
 2022 - The Equalizer (2021 TV series) Universal Television CBS Studios
 2022 - Jack Ryan (TV series) Skydance Television Paramount Television Studios Amazon Studios
 2022 - Ismael's Ghosts Les Fantômes d'Ismaël Arnaud Desplechin Léa Mysius Why Not Productions
 2022 - Cyberpunk 2077 PlayStation 5 Xbox Series X and Series S
 2022 - S.W.A.T. (2017 TV series) Original Film Justin Lin CBS Studios Sony Pictures Television
 2022 - The Rookie: Feds ABC Signature Entertainment One
 2022 - Slow Horses James Hawes Mick Herron See-Saw Films Sony Pictures Television Studios
 2023 - Sin Huellas Koldo Serra Amazon Studios
 2023 - Löre & Luc Der Audio Verlag 
 2023 - Die fliegende Schule der Abenteurer Coppenrath Verlag Sony Music
 2023 - Deadpool 3

External links 
 Offizielle Website
 

Living people
Russian male film actors
Year of birth missing (living people)